Sabrina D. Harman (born January 5, 1978) is an American former soldier who was court-martialed by the United States Army for prisoner abuse after the 2003–2004 Abu Ghraib prisoner abuse scandal. Along with other soldiers of her Army Reserve unit, the 372nd Military Police Company, she was accused of allowing and inflicting physical and psychological abuse on Iraqi detainees in Abu Ghraib prison, a notorious prison in Baghdad during the United States' occupation of Iraq.

Harman was convicted of maltreatment of detainees, conspiracy to maltreat detainees, and dereliction of duty. She was sentenced to six months in prison, forfeiture of all her pay and benefits, demoted, and given a bad conduct discharge.

Harman was imprisoned in the Naval Consolidated Brig, Miramar in San Diego, California.

Early life and education
Harman was born in Lorton, Virginia. Her father was a homicide detective, and the family often saw photos of dead people at crime scenes. Harman's mother, Robin, has been described as a "forensics buff". Harman graduated from Robert E. Lee High School in Springfield, Virginia.

Career

After the September 11, 2001 attacks, Harman joined the Army Reserves and was assigned to the Cresaptown, Maryland-based 372nd Military Police company. Harman worked for a time as an assistant manager at Papa John's Pizza in Alexandria, Virginia, before her company was activated for duty in Iraq in February 2003, and was deployed to Fort Lee, Virginia for additional training; however, this was in combat support, not I/R (military jargon for "internment and resettlement"). While Harman acknowledged that she knew there was a lot of wrong being done, she claims she knew nothing about there being any official rules about prisoner treatment, such as the Geneva Conventions.

Harman's response

A letter home quoted in The New Yorker:

As quoted in The Washington Post:

[She] said she was assigned to break down prisoners for interrogation. "They would bring in one to several prisoners at a time already hooded and cuffed," Harman said in interviews by e-mail this week from Baghdad. "The job of the MP was to keep them awake, make it hell so they would talk." She said her military police unit took direction from the military intelligence officers in charge of the facility and from civilian contractors there who conducted interrogations.

At her sentencing:

As a soldier and military police officer, I failed my duties and failed my mission to protect and defend. I not only let down the people in Iraq, but I let down every single soldier that serves today. My actions potentially caused an increased hatred and insurgency towards the United States, putting soldiers and civilians at greater risk. I take full responsibility for my actions. ... The decisions I made were mine and mine alone.

Citings
Harman's attorney said he hoped to see the military chain of command put on trial, rather than low-ranking reservists like Harman. "I don't think we can even begin to imagine the kind of environment that she was in. First of all, she wasn't trained to be a prison guard, so she didn't even know the basic rules. She wasn't trained in military intelligence. I don't think any American can really truly appreciate the stress that existed along with the fact they were undermanned and not trained to perform this mission," he said.

See also

Standard Operating Procedure (film)

References

Further reading
 " She's No Stranger To Grisly Images." CBS: 10 May 2004. 18 June 2004.
 Spinner, Jackie. "Soldier: Unit's Role Was to Break Down Prisoners." The Washington Post: 8 May 2004. 18 June 2004.
 Gourevitch, Philip and Errol Morris. Exposure: The woman behind the camera at Abu Ghraib. The New Yorker: March 24, 2008.
 Morris, Errol. The Most Curious Thing. The New York Times: 19 May 2008

External links
Sabrina D. Harman at APImages

1978 births
Living people
American people convicted of torture
United States Army personnel of the Iraq War
People from Lorton, Virginia
Military personnel from Virginia
Women in the Iraq War
Women in the United States Army
American people convicted of assault
American people convicted of war crimes
United States Army personnel who were court-martialed
United States Army soldiers
United States military personnel at the Abu Ghraib prison
United States Army reservists
Prisoners and detainees of the United States military